Yankari Game Reserve is a large wildlife park and former National Park located in the south-central part of Bauchi State, in northeastern Nigeria. Its location in the heartland of the West African savanna makes it a unique way for tourists and holidaymakers to watch wildlife in its natural habitat. Yankari was created as a game reserve in 1956, but later designated Nigeria's biggest national park in 1991. It is the most popular destination for tourists in Nigeria and, as such, plays a crucial role in the development and promotion of tourism and ecotourism in Nigeria. It is also one of the most popular eco-destinations in West Africa.

History
The open country and villages that surround Yankari National Park are populated by farmers and herders, but there has been no human settlement in the park for over a century. There is, however, evidence of earlier human habitation in the park, including old iron smelting sites and caves. The furnaces have been damaged by centuries of exposure to the elements, though by the late 1990s there were more than fifty surviving in the Delimiri and Ampara area.

In 1934, the Northern Regional Committee made a recommendation to the Executive Council to establish a pilot game reserve in the Bauchi Emirate. This was supported by Alhaji Muhammadu Ngeleruma, a minister in the former northern Nigeria Ministry of Agriculture and Natural Resources. Around this time, he had been impressed by a visit to a Sudanese game reserve while on a trip to East Africa. On returning, he encouraged the moves to establish something similar in Nigeria.

In 1956, the Northern Nigeria Government approved the plans for the creation of a Game Preservation area. Yankari was identified as a region in the south of what was then Bauchi Province where large numbers of wild animals existed naturally and could be protected. In 1957 a Game Preservation area was carved out and the area was constituted as a Bauchi Native Authority Forest Reserve.

Yankari was first opened to the public as a premier game reserve on 1 December 1962. Since then, the Northern Eastern State Government and then the Bauchi State Government both managed the Yankari Game Reserve. The park is now managed by the Federal Government of Nigeria, through the National Park Service.

In 1991 it officially became a National Park by decree 36 of the National Government. In the late 1900s the park management began a preservation project for the archaeological sites within the park to encourage heritage tourism.

In 2006 Yankari lost its status as a National Park following a request of the Bauchi State Government.

Ecotourism

Ecotourism or ecological tourism is now favoured by many global environmental organizations and aid agencies as a vehicle to sustainable development. It promotes the conservation of biological diversity by protecting ecosystems and has the local culture, flora and fauna as the main attractions. Yankari Game Reserve fulfils these criteria.

In 2000, Yankari Game Reserve hosted over 20,000 tourists from over 100 countries. This makes it the most popular tourist destination in Nigeria and, if properly managed, it could become a significant part of the development and promotion of tourism throughout Nigeria. It is one of the few remaining areas left in West Africa where wild animals are protected in their natural habitat.

Geography
{ 
  "type": "ExternalData", 
  "service": "geoshape", 
  "ids": "Q1473112", 
  "properties": 
  { 
    "fill-opacity": 0.1,"stroke": "#006000"
  } 
}
Yankari Game Reserve lies in the southern part of the Sudan Savannah. It is composed of savannah grassland with well-developed patches of woodland. It is also a region of rolling hills, mostly between 200m and 400m. Kariyo Hill is the highest point at 640m.

Annual rainfall in the park is between 900mm and 1,000mm. The rainy season is from May to September. Temperatures range between 18C and 35C. During the dry season, the harmattan wind blows from the Sahara, often bringing dusty skies and night temperatures falling as low as 12C. The hottest period falls in March and April when temperatures can rise above 40C in the day.

In the dry season, larger wildlife in the park depend on the Gaji river and its tributaries for survival. This river is the only watershed and cuts the park in two. This increases the chances of seeing elephants at this time of year.

The park's main entrance is at Mainamaji village, about 29 km from Dindima. It is located within the Duguri, Pali and Gwana districts of Alkaleri LGA, Bauchi State.

Geology
The whole park lies on the Karai-Karai formation, of the Tertiary age, which is composed of sandstone, siltstones, kaolinites and grits. Underneath this lies the Gombe formation, of Cretaceous age, composed of sandstones, siltstones, and ironstones. The valleys of the Gaji, Yashi and Yuli Rivers are filled with Alluvium of more recent age. Sandy loans and clayey soils of riverine alluvium occur in the valley of the Gaji Yashi and Yuli Rivers. East of the Gaji valley is a 5–7 km wide band of very poor sandy soils that support a shrub savanna formation

Wildlife

Yankari Game Reserve is an important refuge for over 50 mammal species including African bush elephant, olive baboon, patas monkey, Tantalus monkey, roan antelope, western hartebeest, West African lion, African buffalo, waterbuck, bushbuck and hippopotamus. The lion population is on the verge of extinction. Only 2 lions remained in the park in 2011.
Leopard long presumed to be extinct in the park, but in April 2017, one adult male was captured on WCS camera-trap.
 
There are also over 350 species of bird found in the park. Of these, 130 are residents, 50 are Palearctic migrants and the rest are intra-African migrants that move locally within Nigeria. These birds include the saddle-billed stork, guinea fowl, grey hornbill, and the cattle egret. In recent years there have been no sightings of Critically Endangered White-backed Vultures in Yankari and species probably extirpated from the reserve.

Yankari is recognized as having one of the largest populations of elephants in West Africa, estimated at more than 300 in 2005. The growth of the elephant population has become a problem for surrounding villages at times as the animals enter local farms during the rainy season. The elephants have also stripped the park of many of its baobab trees.

Since 2005, the protected area is considered a Lion Conservation Unit together with Kainji National Park.

Features
Due to underground geothermal activity, Yankari Game Reserve also features four warm water springs. The camp is named after the most well known of these, the Wikki Spring, from the local Duguri language with “Wikki” meaning “where are you?”. The Wikki Warm Spring is the largest spring and is about 13.0 metres wide and 1.9 metres deep. It daily flows 21,000,000 litres of clear, spring water into the Gaji river. The spring has a constant temperature of 31.1 °C throughout the year during both day and night and has been developed for recreation.

The other warm water springs are Dimmil, Gwana, and Mawulgo springs. A fifth spring, Tungan Maliki, is the only cool spring in the park.

Evidence of early human settlements
 Dukkey Wells – 139 wells with interconnecting shafts representing an elaborate water storage system.
 Marshall Caves – 59 dwelling caves dug into sandstone escarpments, which were discovered by P.J. Marshall in 1980. There are rock paintings and engravings in zig-zag form and straight lines.
 Tunga Dutse – a rock with more elaborate engravings than the Marshall caves. Legible writings cover an area on the sandstone rock embankment of about 4m in length in Dwall River. The writings are legible. However, their age and meanings have not been determined 
 Iron Smelting – the shau shau iron smelting works has about 60 standing shaft furnaces, which are believed to be the largest historical industrial complex of its time in the West Africa Sub-region

Geographical features
 Kalban Hill – meaning “flat place” a flat topped hill gives tourists a complete view of the park
 Kariyo Hill – located near the Marshal caves is a beautiful picnic ground
 Paliyaram Hill – a popular camp for poachers, located 10 km from Wikki.
 The Tonglong Gorge – a scenic gorge with associated hills, buttes and escarpments located in the west of the park

See also
Sumu Wildlife Park

References

National parks of Nigeria
Bauchi State
Protected areas established in 1991
Tourist attractions in Bauchi State
1991 establishments in Nigeria